Knapton railway station was a minor railway station serving the villages of East Knapton and West Knapton in North Yorkshire, England. Located on the York to Scarborough Line it was opened on 5 July 1845 by the York and North Midland Railway. It closed on 22 September 1930.

Level crossing crash
On 3 February 2009 a car was driven onto the level crossing which struck the rear end of a First TransPennine Express service from Liverpool Lime Street to Scarborough.

References

External links
 Knapton station on navigable 1947 O. S. map
 BBC report about 2009 level crossing crash

Disused railway stations in North Yorkshire
Railway stations in Great Britain opened in 1845
Railway stations in Great Britain closed in 1930
Former York and North Midland Railway stations
George Townsend Andrews railway stations